Thomas Kay (24 April 1883 – 1934) was an English footballer who played in the Football League for Bury.

References

1883 births
1934 deaths
People from Ramsbottom
English footballers
Association football forwards
English Football League players
Blackburn Rovers F.C. players
Nelson F.C. players
Bury F.C. players